Daretis Phrygii Ilias De bello Troiano ("The Iliad of Dares the Phrygian: On the Trojan War") is an epic poem in Latin, written around 1183 by the English poet Joseph of Exeter. It tells the story of the ten year Trojan War as it was known in medieval western Europe. The ancient Greek epic on the subject, the Iliad, was inaccessible; instead, the sources available included the fictional "diaries" of Dictys of Crete and Dares of Phrygia. When Joseph's text was printed for the first time in 1541, it was actually erroneously attributed to Dares of Phrygia, announced as the long-lost verse version of his story  (quibus multis seculis caruimus – which we lacked for many centuries) supposedly put into Latin hexameters by Nepos.

Notes

References

 Mortimer, Richard Angevin England 1154-1258 Oxford: Blackwell 1994

External links
 English translation by A. G. Rigg available
 Latin edition from 1824 (Internet Archive)
 1541 editio princeps in original Latin (Bavarian State Library)

12th-century Latin books
12th-century poems
Epic poems in Latin
Trojan War literature
1183 works